The Tower of Punta d'Arcu is a ruined Genoese tower located in the commune of Borgo, Haute-Corse on the east coast of Corsica. Only part of the base survives.

The tower was one of a series of coastal defences constructed by the Republic of Genoa between 1530 and 1620 to stem the attacks by Barbary pirates. It is included in a list of the towers defending the Corsican coastline compiled by the Genoese authorities in 1617 (as Ponte darco).

See also
List of Genoese towers in Corsica

Notes and references

Towers in Corsica